Isabelle Glacier is an alpine glacier located  southwest of Shoshoni Peak, in Roosevelt National Forest in the US state of Colorado. The glacier is immediately east of the Continental Divide on the opposite side of the divide from Fair Glacier. Isabelle Glacier is the source of the South Saint Vrain Creek and can be reach by trail and is a  round-trip hike from the trailhead.

See also
List of glaciers in the United States

References

Glaciers of Colorado
Landforms of Boulder County, Colorado